Magyar may refer to:

 Hungarians
 Hungarian language
 Magyar tribes, fundamental political units of Hungarians between the period of leaving the Ural Mountains and the entrance of the Carpathian Basin
 Zoltán Magyar (born 1953), Hungarian gymnast
 A character from the videogame Brawlhalla.

See also
 Magar (disambiguation)
 Mugel, a Hun tribe
 

Language and nationality disambiguation pages